Solapur Railway Division is one of the divisions of Central Railway Zone (India) of Indian Railways.It is the largest division in Central Railway covering 10 districts of Maharashtra, Karnataka & Telangana.
Option of Ahmednagar Karmala railway line is also getting explored.

List of railway stations and towns 
The list includes the stations under the Solapur CR division and their station category.

Routes
Manmad(exclude)-Ahmednagar-Daund Jn. Daund jn to ankai.
Daund Jn - Kurudwadi Jn - Solapur
Miraj Jn(exclude) - Pandharpur -Kurduwadi Jn -Barshi - Dharashiv - Latur - Latur Road
Solapur - Hotgi Jn - Gulburga - Wadi Jn (Include)

References

 
Divisions of Indian Railways